John Aguirre (born Juanito Aguirre; August 22, 1919 – November 2007) was a Canadian football player who played for the Calgary Stampeders. He won the Grey Cup with them in 1948. From 1948–50, Aguirre played 27 games with the Stampeders.

Previously, Aguirre attended the University of Southern California where he played college football for the USC Trojans. Aguirre was selected in the 16th round of the 1944 NFL Draft by the Cleveland Rams with the 163rd overall pick.

References

1919 births
2007 deaths
Calgary Stampeders players
USC Trojans football players
Cleveland Rams players
Players of American football from San Francisco
Players of Canadian football from San Francisco